The 22nd Canadian Parliament was in session from November 12, 1953, until April 12, 1957.  The membership was set by the 1953 federal election on August 10, 1953, and it changed only somewhat due to resignations and by-elections until it was dissolved prior to the 1957 election.

It was controlled by a Liberal Party majority under Prime Minister Louis St. Laurent and the 17th Canadian Ministry.  The Official Opposition was the Progressive Conservative Party, led first by George Drew, and then by William Earl Rowe, George Drew (again), William Earl Rowe, and John Diefenbaker consecutively.

The Speaker was Louis-René Beaudoin.  See also List of Canadian electoral districts 1952-1966 for a list of the ridings in this parliament.

There were five sessions of the 22nd Parliament.

List of members

Following is a full list of members of the twenty-second Parliament listed first by province, then by electoral district.

Electoral districts denoted by an asterisk (*) indicates that district was represented by two members.

Alberta

British Columbia

Manitoba

New Brunswick

Newfoundland

Northwest Territories

Nova Scotia

Ontario

Prince Edward Island

Quebec

Saskatchewan

Yukon

By-elections

References

Succession

Canadian parliaments
1953 establishments in Canada
1957 disestablishments in Canada
1953 in Canada
1954 in Canada
1955 in Canada
1956 in Canada
1957 in Canada